Nikol Hasler (born 15 March 1979) is an American internet content creator, producer, writer, and filmmaker known best for her work on Midwest Teen Sex Show, and her frank, direct, dark humor.

Biography 
Nikol Hasler is a Wisconsin native who spent years in the foster care system.

In high school she was an avid LARP'er with a group of other kids.

Hasler gained attention in 2008 as the host of the video podcast Midwest Teen Sex Show, an informative comedy show known for frank discussions about teenage sexuality.    The show's success prompted her to move to Los Angeles in June 2009 with her three children.   During that summer, she produced and wrote a television pilot for Comedy Central based on the web series, and worked on a book about sex for teens. Comedy Central did not pick up the show as a series, but her book, Sex: A Book For Teens was released in June, 2010. Hasler remained in Los Angeles after the pilot was shot, stating on Crushable that "Even the d-bags out here who are stereotypical LA don’t bother me because they give me something to laugh at. The sunshine. The food. The hot people. Yeah. This place is cool."

Works 
Hasler was interviewed for the January/February 2009 issue of Public Libraries Magazine (Vol 47, Issue 6).

On May 14, 2009, it was officially announced that Nikol's show The Midwest Teen Sex Show, a video podcast about teen sexuality, would be turned into a series for Comedy Central.   However, in September 2009 Hasler announced that Comedy Central had not picked up the show for series.  Beyond the Midwest Teen Sex Show, Hasler has contributed to projects for a number of publishing outlets, and in various media.

Real American Family, a show on PiC.tv, addresses issues important to many families—being a single parent, choosing healthy diet, preparing for the school year, etc. -- with Nikol's typical frankness and sense of humor. She and her team also created an online safety video for teens called Don't Be An Idiot Online; it was released by E-Spin.

In February 2010, she started an ongoing sex column for the newly launched Crushable called "Sex, Honestly". She also writes an advice column for Milwaukee Magazine called "Love, Sex, Etc.".

In May 2010, copies of Hasler's book, Sex: A Book For Teens, went on sale on Amazon.com. It was published by Zest Publications in San Francisco. The book features back cover endorsements from former surgeon general Dr. Jocelyn Elders and feminist author Betty Dodson.

In July 2010, Hasler accepted a position of a producer for the non-profit One Economy Corporation (of which PiC.tv is a subsidiary), immediately beginning production on a series about teen pregnancy, then revamping Real American Family with an entirely new cast and crew.

In March 2013, Hasler began working for PBS in Los Angeles.

References

Press 
  About's sexuality page
 Ypulse
 Search Engine World interview with Hasler, August 2008
 ABC News Interview with Hasler, January 2008 
 Interview about MTSS
 NewTeeVee interview with Hasler
 Interview about Real American Family
 Interview with Violet Blue
 Hasler on CBS Early Show
 Hasler interview with Gawker

External links 
 Midwest Teen Sex Show 
 Nikol Hasler Twitter Page
 Press regarding the speaking engagements with Hasler at NYC Public Libraries

1979 births
Living people
American women screenwriters
American comedy writers
Actresses from Wisconsin
American sex columnists
American women columnists
American women comedians
American women non-fiction writers
Screenwriters from Wisconsin
Women screenwriters
21st-century American comedians
21st-century American screenwriters
21st-century American women writers